Ghulam Muhammed Quader (born 24 February 1948), better known as GM Quader, is a Bangladeshi politician and the current chairperson of Jatiya Party. He is the incumbent Jatiya Sangsad member from the Lalmonirhat-3 constituency. He served as the Minister of Commerce and Minister of Civil Aviation and Tourism from 2009 to 2014.

Early life and family
Quader was born on 24 February 1948 to a Bengali Muslim family with roots in Dinhata. His parents were Mokbul Hossain and Majida Khatun. Mokbul was a lawyer and served as a minister of the erstwhile Maharaja of Cooch Behar. Quader had eight siblings including the former President of Bangladesh Hussain Muhammad Ershad, banker Mozammel Hossain Lalu and Merina Rahman. He is married to Sharifa Quader.

Education
Quader completed his SSC and HSC from Rangpur Zilla School and Rangpur Carmichael College. He obtained his BSc in mechanical engineering from Bangladesh University of Engineering and Technology (BUET) in 1969.

Career
Quader is a presidium member of the Jatiya Party (JP). Additionally, he held important posts in important ministries and organizations including the Ministry of Establishment, Bangladesh Petroleum Corporation, Jamuna Oil Company and Bangladesh Tobacco Company (now British American Tobacco Bangladesh). He worked in the Ministry of Agriculture in Iraq as a mechanical engineer from 1976 to 1977.

Quader was elected to parliament with a Jatiya Party ticket in the seventh parliamentary election and served as member of parliamentary standing committee on defence ministry. He was also elected as lawmaker in eighth parliamentary election and served as a member of standing committee on agriculture ministry.

Quader was elected to parliament from Lalmonirhat-3 on 7 January 2019 as a candidate of Jatiya party. He received 149,641 votes while his nearest rival, Asadul Habib Dulu of Bangladesh Nationalist Party, received 80,225 votes.

From 2016, he joined his elder brother, Hussain Muhammad Ershad, who was the founder and chairman of the Jatiya Party. Ershad had declared to make Quader the co-chairman of the party although Ershad's wife Rowshan Ershad and her MPs were against the decision. In May 2019, Ershad appointed Quader acting chairman of Jatiya Party. In July 2019, he became chairman of the party. His leadership has been challenged by Bidisha Ershad, wife of Ershad, and Rowshan Ershad, another wife of Ershad and co-chairperson of the party.

References

Living people
1948 births
Bangladesh University of Engineering and Technology alumni
Chairmen of Jatiya Party (Ershad)
Civil Aviation and Tourism ministers of Bangladesh
Commerce ministers of Bangladesh
11th Jatiya Sangsad members
7th Jatiya Sangsad members
9th Jatiya Sangsad members
Bangladeshi people of Indian descent
People from Cooch Behar district
20th-century Bengalis
21st-century Bengalis